Alloy is the debut album by heavy metal act Trillium. It was released in 2011 by the Italian record label Frontiers Records in Europe.

Track listing

Personnel
Amanda Somerville - lead & backing vocals, keyboards, engineer
Sascha Paeth - guitars, bass, keyboards, drums, producer, engineer, mixing
Sander Gommans - guitars, bass, engineer
Miro - arrangements, keyboards, engineer
Olaf Reitmeier - acoustic guitars, engineer
Robert Hunecke-Rizzo - drums
Simon Oberender - keyboards, mastering
Jørn Lande - guest lead vocals on track 7

References

External links
Frontiers Records official site

2011 debut albums
Frontiers Records albums